Renáta Štrbíková (born 6 August 1979) is a Czech table tennis player, born in Havířov. She competed in women's singles and women's doubles at the 2004 Summer Olympics in Athens.

References

External links

1979 births
Living people
People from Havířov
Czech female table tennis players
Olympic table tennis players of the Czech Republic
Table tennis players at the 2004 Summer Olympics
Table tennis players at the 2015 European Games
European Games medalists in table tennis
European Games bronze medalists for the Czech Republic
Sportspeople from the Moravian-Silesian Region